Larisa Khmelnitskaya (née Ramazanova; born September 23, 1971 in Saransk, Respublika Mordoviya) is a retired female race walker who competed for Russia and Belarus

International competitions

References

1971 births
Living people
People from Saransk
Sportspeople from Mordovia
Belarusian female racewalkers
Russian female racewalkers
Olympic female racewalkers
Olympic athletes of Belarus
Athletes (track and field) at the 2000 Summer Olympics
Universiade gold medalists in athletics (track and field)
Universiade gold medalists for Belarus
Medalists at the 1997 Summer Universiade
Medalists at the 1993 Summer Universiade
Medalists at the 1995 Summer Universiade
World Athletics Championships athletes for Russia
World Athletics Championships athletes for Belarus
Russian Athletics Championships winners